A motorsport is a competitive sporting event which involves the use of motorised vehicles.

Motorsport or motor sport may also refer to:

Arts, entertainment, and media
 Motor Sport (magazine), first issued in 1924 in the United Kingdom and published by Motor Sport Magazine Limited
 "MotorSport", a song by Migos, Nicki Minaj and Cardi B from the album Culture 2
 Motorsport.tv, a Pan-European digital television channel

Sports
 Motorsport in Australia
 Motorsport in Canada
 Motorsport in the United Kingdom
 Motorsport in the United States
 Motor sport in New Zealand